Caroline Delisle (born October 5, 1969) is a former professional tennis player from Canada.

Biography
Delisle, who grew up in the Quebec borough of Chicoutimi, played collegiate tennis at Oklahoma State University.

She competed on the professional tour in the 1990s, primarily as a doubles player.

Her most noted performance in singles came at the 1993 Canadian Open where she made the second round, with a win over Elizabeth Smylie.

At the 1994 Canadian Open she was a semi-finalist in the doubles, with Mélanie Bernard, who was her regular partner on the WTA Tour. They lost the semi-final in a third set tie-break, to Linda Harvey-Wild and Chanda Rubin.

In 1995 she reached a career best 94 in the world doubles rankings and appeared in the main draw of three grand slam tournaments that year. She made the third round of the 1995 French Open partnering Mélanie Bernard, before losing to eventual champions Gigi Fernández and Natasha Zvereva. At Wimbledon she and Bernard were beaten in the first round, then at the US Open she made it to the second round, with Nicole Pratt as her partner.

ITF finals

Doubles (5–4)

References

External links
 
 

1969 births
Living people
Canadian female tennis players
Racket sportspeople from Quebec
Sportspeople from Saguenay, Quebec
Oklahoma State Cowgirls tennis players